Urban Hymns is the third studio album by English alternative rock band the Verve, released on 29 September 1997 on Hut Records. It earned nearly unanimous critical praise upon its release, and went on to become the band's best-selling release and one of the biggest selling albums of the year. , Urban Hymns is ranked the 19th best-selling album in UK chart history and has sold over ten million copies worldwide. This is the only Verve album to feature guitarist and keyboardist Simon Tong, who initially joined the band to replace their original guitarist Nick McCabe. McCabe rejoined the band soon after, however, and Tong was considered the fifth member of the band; this makes the album the only one that the band recorded as a five-piece.

The album features the hit singles "Bitter Sweet Symphony", "Lucky Man" and UK number one "The Drugs Don't Work". The critical and commercial success of the album saw the band win two Brit Awards in 1998, including Best British Album, and appear on the cover of Rolling Stone in April 1998. "Bitter Sweet Symphony" was nominated for the Grammy Award for Best Rock Song. It was also among ten albums nominated for the best British album of the previous 30 years by the Brit Awards in 2010, ultimately losing to (What's the Story) Morning Glory? by Oasis. In 2013, NME ranked it at number 128 in its list of the 500 Greatest Albums of All Time.

Background
The Verve had previously released two albums, A Storm in Heaven in 1993 and A Northern Soul in 1995. The band had only achieved moderate commercial success up to that point, and the band split shortly after their second album due to internal conflicts. Vocalist Richard Ashcroft quickly reformed the group, with Simon Tong, an old friend of the band on guitar; however, Ashcroft realised Nick McCabe's unique guitar style was required to complete the true Verve unit and later asked him to return. Tong also remained, adding more guitar and keyboard and organ textures.

Recording 
The Verve initially worked with the producer John Leckie, but discarded the work. They recorded several tracks with Youth as producer, but once McCabe returned they re-recorded several tracks and changed producers to Chris Potter. McCabe said that in the next seven months "the key tracks were recorded from scratch, but some of them were already there". According to Youth, "Towards the end, Richard wanted to chuck all the album away and start again. What was my reaction? Horror. Sheer horror. All I could say was, I really think you should reconsider."

"Bitter Sweet Symphony" is based on a sample of a 1965 orchestral version of the Rolling Stones song "The Last Time" by the Andrew Oldham Orchestra. The Verve looped four bars, then added dozens of further tracks, including guitar, percussion, additional strings, and several layered vocals from Ashcroft. Allen Klein, who owned the copyrights to the Rolling Stones' early work, refused clearance for the sample; following a lawsuit, the Verve ceded the songwriting credits and royalties. In 2019, Klein's son and the Rolling Stones returned the credits and royalties to Ashcroft.

The guitarist Nick McCabe said that most of the songs originated with Ashcroft singing and playing chords on an acoustic guitar, to which the rest of the band added other parts. He said: "It wasn't that much different from the processes that went into the earlier records. We all developed ideas on the spot and things happened additively ... They weren't products of Richard's mind. We dressed the acoustic guitar and the voice." He said he was unhappy that Ashcroft received sole songwriting credit on many tracks, because "I know what my part was in making that record. A lot of those tracks bare his name because we had a manager who encouraged that line of thinking at the time."

Release and reception

Urban Hymns received critical acclaim. Melody Maker hailed it as "an album of unparalleled beauty so intent on grabbing at the strands of music's multi-hued history". Ted Kessler of NME praised it as the Verve's best album to date, adding that its first five songs alone "pound all other guitar albums this year – bar Radiohead's OK Computer – into the ground with their emotional ferocity and deftness of melodic touch." Similarly, the Rolling Stone critic David Fricke deemed it "a defiantly psychedelic record – soaked in slipstream guitars and breezy strings, cruising at narcotic-shuffle velocity – about coping and crashing". The Los Angeles Times Sara Scribner noted its "lush, intricate, ethereal sound" and felt that the Verve had "delivered an achingly beautiful record that's just desperate enough to never get boring."

In a more mixed assessment, Greg Kot of the Chicago Tribune felt that Urban Hymns lacked more songs as memorable as "Bitter Sweet Symphony" and "The Drugs Don't Work" to justify the album's long length. Robert Christgau of The Village Voice cited "The Drugs Don't Work" track as a "choice cut", calling it "a good song on an album that isn't worth your time or money".

Urban Hymns spent 12 weeks at the top of the UK Albums Chart, with a total of 124 weeks on the chart. It also became the Verve's first charting album in the United States, where it debuted at number 63 on the Billboard 200, giving the band their first commercial success in the country. Urban Hymns ultimately peaked at number 23 on the chart and was certified Platinum by the RIAA on 4 April 1998; it remains the group's best-selling album in the United States, with more than 1.3 million copies sold .

Legacy
Melody Maker named Urban Hymns as the number one album of 1997 in its year-end list, and the album ranked at number three on NMEs year-end critics' poll. Q also included it in their own list of the best albums of 1997, and it ranked at number 18 on The Village Voices year-end Pazz & Jop critics' poll. At the 1998 Brit Awards, Urban Hymns won the award for Best British Album and the Verve were awarded Best British Group. The same year, Richard Aschroft won an Ivor Novello Award for Songwriter of the Year. The album was also shortlisted for the Mercury Prize, which was ultimately awarded to Gomez' Bring It On. By April 1999, however, renewed tensions within the band, particularly between Ashcroft and McCabe, would lead the Verve to split up for a second time, at the height of their success.

In the years following its release, Urban Hymns has received much acclaim. In 2000 it was voted number 213 in Colin Larkin's All Time Top 1000 Albums. Q included it in their 1999 list of the 90 best albums of the 1990s, while the magazine's readers voted it the eighteenth best album of all-time in 1998, later moved up to sixteenth place in a similar list compiled in 2006. The Verve were awarded with the first ever Q Classic Album award for Urban Hymns at the 2007 Q Awards, and the following year, Urban Hymns was ranked as the tenth best British album of all time in a poll jointly conducted by Q and HMV. It was also nominated for Best British Album of the Last 30 Years at the 2010 Brit Awards, but lost to Oasis' (What's the Story) Morning Glory?. In 2013, NME ranked it at number 128 in its list of the 500 Greatest Albums of All Time. The album was also included in the book 1001 Albums You Must Hear Before You Die.

In a retrospective review, Stephen Thomas Erlewine of AllMusic called Urban Hymns "a rich album that revitalizes rock traditions without ever seeming less than contemporary", further crediting it as the album that The Verve had "been striving to make since their formation." BBC Music critic Wendy Roby wrote in 2010 that Urban Hymns "still sounds thrilling" and "soars with autumnal melancholy", crediting the album's mix of "massive, sweeping" arrangements and Ashcroft's "heartbreaking" lyrics as its key characteristics. Uncut wrote that "the most striking qualities of Urban Hymns now are its musical coherence and the powerfully sustained mood of melancholic stoicism." Emily Tartanella of Magnet felt that Urban Hymns was undeserving of its accolades, calling it "one of the most bloated, boring and overpraised albums of the '90s."

Track listing
All songs written by Richard Ashcroft, except where noted.

Note: The original album's digital version and Japanese version has "Deep Freeze" as a separate track following "Come On", without the silence in between (on the Japanese version due to the limited duration of the CD). In the 2017 digital and physical remastered versions, both tracks are joined with the silence.

B-sides
A total of 10 other songs were released as B-sides for the album's singles, in various configurations.

Personnel
The Verve
 Richard Ashcroft – lead vocals, rhythm guitar, keyboard
 Nick McCabe – lead guitar
 Simon Tong – second lead guitar, keyboard
 Simon Jones – bass
 Peter Salisbury – drums
Additional personnel
 Liam Gallagher – backing vocals ("Come On"), hand claps ("Space and Time")
Technical
 Youth – producer 
 Chris Potter – producer, engineer, mixing, recording, additional production
 The Verve – producer
 Mel Wesson – programming
 Paul Anthony Taylor – programming
 Will Malone – conductor, string arrangements
 Gareth Ashton – assistant engineer
 Lorraine Francis – assistant engineer
 Jan Kybert – assistant engineer
 Tony Cousins – mastering engineer
 Crispin Murray – editing, assistant mastering
 Brian Cannon – director, design, sleeve art
 Martin Catherall – design assistant
 Matthew Sankey – design assistant
Michael Spencer Jones – photography
 John Horsley – photography
 Chris Floyd – photography

Charts

Weekly charts

Year-end charts

Decade-end charts

Certifications and sales

See also
 List of best-selling albums in the United Kingdom

References

External links

Urban Hymns at YouTube (streamed copy where licensed)

The Verve albums
Hut Records albums
1997 albums
Virgin Records albums
Brit Award for British Album of the Year
Albums produced by Chris Potter (record producer)
Albums produced by Youth (musician)